Cirsium quercetorum is a species of thistle endemic to coastal California, its common names include brownie thistle and Alameda thistle.

Distribution
Cirsium quercetorum is endemic to the Outer California Coast Ranges from Santa Barbara's Point Conception north into the San Francisco Bay Area and up the North Coast as far as Humboldt County. This is a common plant found in coastal  grasslands and open woodlands.

Description
The perennial Cirsium quercetorum plant usually grows clumped low to the ground, less than 20 cm (8 inches) tall, but occasionally the plant grows erect and can reach 90 cm (36 inches) in height. It has spiny lobed toothy leaves and spiny flower heads with brownish ivory-tan white to purple disc florets but no ray florets.

References

External links

C. Michael Hogan ed. 2010. Cirsium quercetorum. Encyclopedia of Life
Jepson Manual Treatment — Cirsium quercetorum
Cirsium quercetorum— Calphotos Photo gallery, University of California

quercetorum
Endemic flora of California
Plants described in 1874
Natural history of the California chaparral and woodlands
Natural history of the California Coast Ranges
Natural history of the San Francisco Bay Area